Events from the year 1884 in Russia.

Incumbents
 Monarch – Alexander III

Events

  
 
 Congresso de Viena
 Academicheskaya Dacha
 Shamordino Convent
 Russia–Korea Treaty of 1884
 Trial of the Fourteen

Births
 January 2 – Ben-Zion Dinur, Russian-born Israeli educator, historian and politician (d. 1973)
 February 12 – Marie Vassilieff, Russian artist (d. 1957)
 July 18 – Alexandra Tolstaya, Russian activist (d. 1979)
 December 14 – Nicholas Charnetsky, Orthodox priest, bishop, martyr and blessed (d. 1959)

Deaths

References

1884 in Russia
Years of the 19th century in the Russian Empire